The National United Party of Arakan (NUPA) is a political organisation and insurgent group in Rakhine State, Myanmar. It was formed in 1994 as a merger between four nationalist groups, including a faction of the Communist Party of Arakan.

History 
At its inception in 1994, the NUPA was formed of multiple different nationalist organisations including its forerunner the National United Front of Arakan, and a faction of the Arakanese Communist Party. 

On 11 February 1998, the commander-in-chief of the NUPA and its armed forces (the original Arakan Army), Major-General Khaing Razar and six Arakanese and Karen leaders were assassinated by the Indian Navy in the Indian archipelago of Andaman. Remaining Arakanese and Karen cadres were arrested and imprisoned for more than a decade in Indian prisons. The 34 guerrillas or freedom fighters were arrested by the Indian navy just after arriving on Landfall Island in the Andaman Sea for a supposed meeting with Indian Intelligence officials. Some leaders were killed and the rest were held without charge for more than eight years in the Andaman islands.

The detainees claimed they had reached a deal with Indian Intelligence allowing them to establish a base on Landfall Island in the Nicobar and Andaman archipelago in exchange for providing intelligence on Chinese naval activities in the Andaman Sea. They have said they asked India not to send them back to Burma. Later, they were transferred to a prison in Kolkata, charged with entering the country without valid papers, for smuggling weapons and explosives, and for attempting to sell them to insurgents in North-Eastern India.

On 7 February 2001, the central committee of NUPA released a statement concerning the increase in sectarian violence against the Rohingya of Rakhine State:

On 12 July 2010, a court in Kolkata sentenced the 34 Burmese exiles to 15 months imprisonment and a fine of 6,000 rupees [US $130] each, after they had spent more than 10 years behind bars on charges related to insurgency. Although their prison terms were already served, the rebels were obliged to remain in prison because they did not have permission to stay in India.

On 19 May 2011, after the recognition of the rebels’ refugee status by the UNHCR, the Indian government finally ordered the 31 prisoners’ release from detention.

United Nations High Commissioner for Refugees (UNHCR) arranged a resettlement program for the 31 Arakan and Karen guerrillas who spent 13 years in an Indian prison. On their release in June 2012, 31 of the insurgents were granted asylum in the Netherlands under a resettlement program organized by the United Nations High Commissioner for Refugees. The 31 convicted freedom fighters left New Delhi for Amsterdam in June 2012. Two others, an ethnic Karen and a Rakhine, remained in India as their case for resettlement was under consideration. One other freed convict, a Rakhine named Min Thar Tun, died from a heart attack a few months ago.

An ethnic Karen, Pho Cho said that they will never forget how they have suffered due to a false deal that was made with Indian Intelligence. “We forgive everything that India did to us, but we will never forget that our leaders were killed, even though they had done nothing wrong,” he said. “We were tied up, blindfolded, thrown around, and treated like enemies of the state.”

Danya Linn, an ethnic Arakanese leader, said, “Since India is one of the largest democratic countries in the world, we believe that this kind of inhumanity and undemocratic action will never again be repeated. Nonetheless, we thank the Indian government for giving us one-year permits to stay in the country, during which time we were able to determine our future.”

The NUPA was officially dissolved at a meeting of Central Committee members on 5 December  and merged with the ULA/AA on 6 December 2020, U Soe Lin Tun explained. “We are determined to carry out the task of uniting under the leadership of Major-General Twan Mrat Naing at the cost of our lives,” he said. The decision to merge with the ULA/AA was made as some leaders of the NUPA have died and others are in poor health and are unable to move forward politically, said U Soe Lin Tun, spokesperson for the NUPA/AA. “We want to shape a new future revolutionary history by disbanding the NUPA once headed by Major-General Khaing Razar, who was famous in the history of the Arakanese Revolution, and joining the Way of Rakhita led by Major-General Twan Mrat Naing,” he added, referring to the leader of the Arakan Army (AA) ethnic armed group, of which the ULA is its political wing. 

On 12 December 2020, the NUPA announced in a statement that the National United Party of Arakan (NUPA) has been disbanded and merged with the United League of Arakan / Arakan Army (ULA/AA). It also states that the NUPA Central Committee members and cadres held a meeting on 11 November 2020 at the Myanmar-Bangladesh border and agreed to dissolve the NUPA and join the Arakan Army. As well as confirming the position of the ULA/AA as the predominant ethnic Rakhine armed group, the merger may have implications for social cohesion in western Myanmar.

Approach to Rakhine-Rohingya relations 
Unlike many other Rakhine political organizations, NUPA has a strong track record of advocating for and building relationships with Rohingya leaders during armed struggles. In 2000, NUPA and the Arakan Rohingya National Organization (ARNO) formed the Arakan Independence Alliance (AIA), the first coalition between Rakhine and Rohingya leaders since independence in 1948. 

On 7 February 2001, NUPA released a statement raising their concern about the increase in sectarian violence against the Rohingya in Rakhine State, warning that the military government could stir up communal agitation to divide Buddhists and Rohingya by exploiting a violent dispute in a tea shop in Sittwe that month. They accused the government of enforcing discriminatory policies which worsened refugee outflows. 

As documented by the Transnational Institute, another NUPA leader Khin Maung again warned about the potential implication of communal division in Rakhine State at a 2006 peace conference in Bangkok. Sources say that NUPA leader’s effort to improve Rakhine-Rohingya relations was marginalized due to pressure from other Rakhine leaders who were less conciliatory towards the Rohingya. The NUPA-ULA/AA merger is likely to create room for restoring and strengthening Rakhine-Rohingya relations, while enhancing the legitimacy of the Arakan Army’s presence in Rakhine State. Since this relationship plays a crucial part in finding durable solutions in Rakhine State, international agencies should continue monitoring dynamics on the ground, which may be at odds with narratives shared by the top leadership. As noted by NUPA leaders, and many others since, it is also clear that social cohesion has a distinct vertical component, and international actors should continue to work with authorities to address divisive policies.

References 

Political parties in Myanmar
Political parties of minorities
Rebel groups in Myanmar